Saint-Pie is a city in the Montérégie region of southwest Quebec. The population as of the Canada 2011 Census was 5,438.

The former parish municipality of Saint-Pie was amalgamated into the City of Saint-Pie on February 28, 2003.

Demographics 

See also
List of cities in Quebec

References

External links 

 AllRefer.com entry

Cities and towns in Quebec
Incorporated places in Les Maskoutains Regional County Municipality
Canada geography articles needing translation from French Wikipedia